Francisco Lauro Rojas San Román (3 October 1958 – 5 February 2018) was a Mexican politician from the Institutional Revolutionary Party. From 2009 to 2012 he served as Deputy of the LXI Legislature of the Mexican Congress representing the State of Mexico.

Biography
Francisco Rojas San Román had studied as an industrial chemical engineer. He went on to found the company Auto Líneas Fros and Grupo Fros.

As a member of the Institutional Revolutionary Party, he participated in various campaigns and activities as sectional president, municipal, state and national political adviser, as well as general campaign coordinator.

In 1997 he was elected alderman to the City Council of Cuautitlán Izcalli, which he held from that year to 2000 and was headed by the municipal president Julián Angulo Góngora of the PAN.

On two occasions he was elected federal deputy representing the 7th district of the state of Mexico, to the LXI Legislature from 2009 to 2012 in which he held the positions of secretary of the Transportation Commission and member of the Public Safety and Tourism commissions; and to the LXIII Legislature of 2015 in which he held the positions of secretary of the Transportation Commission and member of those of Mexico City and Jurisdictional. 

He died on February 5 after an attack on his life two days prior.

References

1958 births
2018 deaths
Politicians from the State of Mexico
Institutional Revolutionary Party politicians
21st-century Mexican politicians
Assassinated Mexican politicians
Deputies of the LXI Legislature of Mexico
Members of the Chamber of Deputies (Mexico) for the State of Mexico